Preeti Amin is an Indian television actress and reality show participant in India's Best Cinestars Ki Khoj.

Early life and education 
Preeti Amin was born in Hyderabad. She did her schooling in St Andrews High School, Hyderabad and she did her graduation in Kasturba Gandhi College for Women, Secunderabad, Telangana, and St. Francis College for Women, Hyderabad. Before acting in television, Amin taught free style dancing and did theatre and ad modelling.

Personal life 
Preeti Amin married to Lionel Pereira, an American psychiatrist, in 2014. She is currently living in Mumbai.

Career 
She started her acting career in Hindi television with Jhoome Jiiya Re. She has also acted in Dill Mill Gayye, Bhaskar Bharti, Kasamh Se, CID - Aahat (season 4) crossover episode, Lapataganj, SuperCops vs Supervillains, Mrs. Kaushik Ki Paanch Bahuein and Dil Ki Nazar Se Khoobsurat. She also appeared in the Telugu serial Chakravakam.

Preeti Amin has also judged Zee TV Rajasthan's show Nach Le Bindani which is a version of Dance India Dance Super Moms.

Television
Sansani Kheiz
Chakravakam
Aloukika
Nanna
India's Best Cinestars Ki Khoj
Jhoome Jiiya Re
Dill Mill Gayye
Bhaskar Bharti
Kasamh Se
CID - Aahat (season 4) crossover episode
Lapataganj
SuperCops vs Supervillains
Mrs. Kaushik Ki Paanch Bahuein
Dil Ki Nazar Se Khoobsurat
Katha Ankahee as Neerja
Durga Aur Charu as Bholi

References

External links

Living people
Actresses from Hyderabad, India
Indian television actresses
Actresses from Mumbai
Actresses in Hindi television
Year of birth missing (living people)